A "friend of Dorothy" (FOD) is a euphemism for a gay man, first used in LGBT slang, and is more broadly used to describe any LGBTQ person. Stating that, or asking if someone is a friend of Dorothy is a furtive way of suggesting sexual orientation while avoiding hostility. The term was likely based on the character Dorothy Gale of the Oz series of novels, which have been interpreted as including much queer subtext. Actress Judy Garland, who portrayed Dorothy in the 1939 Wizard of Oz film, is considered a gay icon. Writer and critic Dorothy Parker is thought to be another potential origin of the term. The "friend of Dorothy" euphemism was commonly used throughout the 20th century, but its use has declined in recent decades as LGBT acceptance has advanced.

Dorothy from Oz and Judy Garland

Dorothy from Oz 
The precise origin of the term is unknown. Some believe that it is derived from The Road to Oz (1909), a sequel to the first novel, The Wonderful Wizard of Oz (1900). The book introduces readers to Polychrome who, upon meeting Dorothy's travelling companions, exclaims, "You have some queer friends, Dorothy", and she replies, "The queerness doesn't matter, so long as they're friends." There are numerous references to LGBTQ characters and relationships, including a possible innuendo about bisexuality – when Dorothy asks Scarecrow which way to go on the yellow-brick road he says, "Of course some people go both ways" – although it is unknown whether they were intentionally included. For instance, in a case that may be seen as changing gender identity, or being transgender, Ozma, while still an infant, the baby daughter of the former King Pastoria of Oz, was given to the witch Mombi of the North by the Wizard of Oz. Mombi transformed Ozma into a boy and called him "Tip" (short for Tippetarius) in order to prevent the rightful ruler of Oz from ascending to the throne. Thus, Ozma spent her entire childhood with Mombi in the form of the boy Tip, and had no memory of ever having been a girl. Later, Princess Ozma would be the ruler of the fictional land of Oz. Princess Ozma is "one of the first transgender characters in literature." This storyline was revived in Emerald City (2017).

The Wizard of Oz
More commonly, it is stated that friend of Dorothy refers to the derivative 1939 film The Wizard of Oz because Judy Garland, who starred as the main character Dorothy, is a gay icon. In the film, Dorothy is accepting of those who are different. For example, the "gentle lion" giving the line, "I'm afraid there's no denyin', I'm just a dandy lion." The Wizard of Oz has a "particular resonance in the culture of the queer community". The struggles faced by Dorothy, Toto, and friends, especially against the Wicked Witch of the West and her flying monkeys can metaphorically mirror the difficulties of coming out. How the group of outcasts worked together likewise mirrors LGBTQ people who create new chosen families. Researchers also note there is an absence of a heteronormative male–female romance, and Dorothy and her friends "do not need to change themselves to become who they want to be". Many see Garland's portrayal as a "queer journey, an escape from the puritanical, morally rigid, black-and-white small-town life to Technicolor city existence with fabulous friends".

Additionally relevant is the classic song "(Somewhere) Over the Rainbow" that Dorothy (Judy Garland) sings, which was possibly "the most memorable performance" of Garland's career, and the song "contributed to the evolution of the rainbow flag as a gay icon". The song "act[ed] as a cultural catalyst, propelling the eventual embrace of the rainbow symbol by the world's LGBTQ communities". Time magazine, in its August 18, 1967, review of Garland's final engagement at New York's Palace Theatre, observed: "A disproportionate part of her nightly claque seems to be homosexual. The boys in the tight trousers roll their eyes, tear at their hair and practically levitate from their seats, particularly when Judy sings ['Over the Rainbow']."

Judy Garland 

LGBTQ people could also empathize with the personal struggles of Judy Garland, as a persecuted people they identified with suffering. Garland's problems, "the drinking and divorcing, all the pills and all the men, all the poundage come and gone", were documented in the media. She was among the first stars to have her "dirty laundry" aired publicly. She was the "archetype of the triumphant/tragic diva, paving the way for the stormy trajectories of superstars Elizabeth Taylor, Whitney Houston, Amy Winehouse, and Lindsay Lohan". Biographer Gerald Clarke thinks she was likely bipolar, "explaining her many suicide attempts and use of alcohol and pills to self-medicate." Her mental health problems were likely related to childhood trauma, possibly untreated complex PTSD, a common shared experience with LGBTQ+ people. In the face of these challenges she pressed forward, "explaining her enduring popularity among LGBTQ fans". She also endured "self-doubts about her capabilities, suffered crippling stage fright", yet beamed on stage. Onstage "she 'came out', expressing through her skills the real person she was meant to be". LGBTQ people notice this, "admiring her courage and resilience, adopting it as their own". One psychiatrist's explanation: "Judy was beaten up by life, embattled and ultimately had to become more masculine. She has the power that homosexuals would like to have, and they attempt to attain it by idolizing her."

Gay men, particularly older ones, were among her biggest fans:

According to United Press International's Marilyn Malara, "In the 1950s and 1960s, Garland acted as an unofficial mascot for a generation of gay men, who flocked to Garland's many performances, referring to themselves as 'friends of Dorothy.'"

In September 2019, in reporting on the resurgence of interest in Garland due to the biopic Judy starring Renée Zellweger, Louis Staples analyzed Garland’s story, to "understand how and why some gay men look to famous women to help them navigate the world." Both Dorothy and Garland are taken from ordinary lives into the spectacular, LGBTQ people perceiving themselves as abnormal, different, or "other" could relate to not being ordinary. Once in the Hollywood movie business, Garland’s body was a battleground for never being sexy enough, or slim enough; LGBTQ people can relate to dealing with "body dysmorphia, harm[ing] their bodies, attempt[ing] suicide and suffer from eating disorders." Richard Dyer argues that, after her artistic success in, but commercial failure of A Star Is Born (1954) "Garland’s work and life tells a story of survival, and of someone trying to assert some form of control in a world that was set up to destroy her."

Garland also had a number of gay men in her life including her father Frank Gumm who "preferred the company of very young men". There was speculation for years in the entertainment community that her second husband Vincente Minnelli was gay or bisexual. A biography, Vincente Minnelli: Hollywood's Dark Dreamer, claims he lived as an openly gay man in New York prior to his arrival in Hollywood, where the town pressured him back into the closet. According to the biographer: "He was openly gay in New York – we were able to document names of companions and stories from Dorothy Parker. But when he came to Hollywood, I think he made the decision to repress that part of himself or to become bisexual." Garland's fourth husband, Mark Herron, was gay and in a long-lasting relationship with fellow actor Henry Brandon, which was only briefly interrupted by his marriage to Garland. The two men remained together until Brandon's death in 1990. Garland's daughter Liza Minnelli's first husband, Peter Allen, was discovered by Herron while Allen was performing in Hong Kong. Garland took the act, the Allen Brothers, under her care becoming manager and booking agent, and had them open her concerts in Britain and the United States. Garland also introduced Allen to her daughter, but Allen was having affairs with men before the marriage, he later came out as gay.

Garland's death (June 22, 1969), and funeral held in New York City, happened days before the Stonewall Riots, the spark that started the modern LGBTQ rights movement, took place, although reports are that the riots were spontaneous and not related to her passing.

Dorothy Parker 
Predating The Wizard of Oz origins of the phrase (although not connected to the L. Frank Baum novels) is New York City's celebrated humorist, critic and "defender of human and civil rights" Dorothy Parker, whose social circles in the 1920s and 1930s included gay men. The two origin stories are not mutually exclusive, both could be somewhat true depending on how one learned of the phrase, or even separately where it derived. The socialite would throw "famous parties at Garden of Allah's lavish celebrity villas", gay men would use the phrase for entry. The Prohibition in the United States from 1920-1933, when social alcohol consumption was generally illegal, prompted all forms of illegal activities to circumvent the ban, including the speakeasies during the Roaring Twenties, also known as the Jazz Age. Parker would invite gay men, who would in turn invite other gay men to her gatherings using the code phrase to gain entry. Parker had many gay fans, and was well known for her quick wit and use of sarcasm as well as social activism. Official bans on gays serving in the military first surfaced in the early 20th century. The U.S. introduced a ban in a revision of the Articles of War of 1916 and the UK first prohibited homosexuality in the Army and Air Force Acts in 1955. During World War II (1940s) many U.S. and British servicemen started meeting and forming friendships while serving in Europe. Living in fear of discovery and persecution, many began using the code language that Parker used commonly in her writings as a form of social networking including "friend of Dorothy". In conversation and in letter writing, phrases like "simply divine", "fabulous" and "nelly" began to be used by men, who later brought its use back to the United States. By the 1960s and onward the social stigma of being gay was slowly lifting, including the Stonewall Riots in 1969 which launched the modern LGBTQ rights movement, the phrase wasn't needed as much.

Military investigation  
In the late 1970s and early 1980s, the Naval Investigative Service (NIS) was investigating homosexuality in the Chicago area. Agents discovered that gay men sometimes referred to themselves as "friends of Dorothy". Unaware of the historical meaning of the term, the NIS believed that there actually was a woman named Dorothy at the center of a massive ring of homosexual military personnel, so they launched an enormous and futile hunt for the elusive "Dorothy", hoping to find her and convince her to reveal the names of gay service members.

Usage 

Starting in the late 1980s, on several cruise lines, gay and lesbian  passengers began approaching ship staff, asking them to publicise gatherings in the daily cruise activity list. As the cruise lines were hesitant to announce such things so blatantly in their daily publications, they would list the gathering as a "Meeting of the Friends of Dorothy". The use of this phrase likely comes from the cruise directors who were also familiar with and using the "Friends of Bill W." phrase in their programs to tell members of Alcoholics Anonymous that there were support group meetings on the trip.

Such meetings have expanded in popularity and frequency over the years. Now, many cruise lines will have multiple FOD events, sometimes as many as one each night. Despite this, many FOD meetings have low turnout rates.

Friend of Mrs. King 
Similar to friend of Dorothy is friend of Mrs. King (i.e. Queen, in the meaning of "gay man"). This was used in England, mostly in the first half of the 20th century.

See also 

Judy Garland as gay icon
LGBT slang
Rufus Does Judy at Carnegie Hall

Notes

References

Further reading 

 
  (Twenty-nine essays covering aspects of the gay and lesbian world from ancient to contemporary times.)
  (Explores the use of language to define gay and lesbian culture by examining stereotypes as access points into history.)

External links 
 Cruise Critic on "Friends of Dorothy"
 

Euphemisms
Cultural depictions of Judy Garland
LGBT slang
Male homosexuality
Oz (franchise)
1900s neologisms